Charles R. Sanderson (1887–1956) was a Canadian librarian. He was chief librarian of the Toronto Public Library from 1937 to 1956, following George Locke. The Charles R. Sanderson Memorial Branch of the Toronto Public Library, which opened in 1968 in Alexandra Park, is named after him.

References

External links
 Charles Rupert Sanderson biography at Ex Libris Association

1887 births
1956 deaths
Canadian librarians